Sir Barnaby Whigg; Or, No Wit Like A Womans is a 1681 comedy play by the English writer Thomas D'Urfey. It was first staged by the King's Company at the Theatre Royal, Drury Lane. A song for the play was composed by Henry Purcell.

The original cast included Thomas Clark as Wilding, Cardell Goodman as Townly, Philip Griffin as Porpuss, Martin Powell as Whigg, John Coysh as Swift, Carey Perin as Benedick, Mary Corbett as Gratiana, Sarah Cooke as Livia and Susanna Percival as Winifred. The published version was dedicated to the politician Lord Berkeley.

References

Bibliography
 McVeagh, John. Thomas Durfey and Restoration Drama: The Work of a Forgotten Writer. Routledge, 2017.
 Van Lennep, W. The London Stage, 1660-1800: Volume One, 1660-1700. Southern Illinois University Press, 1960.

1681 plays
West End plays
Plays by Thomas d'Urfey
Restoration comedy